Nowa Wieś Mała  is a village in the administrative district of Gmina Paszowice, within Jawor County, Lower Silesian Voivodeship, in south-western Poland. Prior to 1945 it was in Germany.

The village has a population of 30.

Gallery

References

Villages in Jawor County